Eucalyptus tindaliae, commonly known as Tindal's stringybark, is a species of tree that is endemic to coastal eastern Australia. It has rough, stringy bark on the trunk and larger branches, lance-shaped to curved adult leaves, flower buds in groups of between nine and fifteen, white flowers and hemispherical fruit.

Description
It has rough, stringy grey bark on the trunk and larger branches. Flowering occurs from May to August in the north of its range and from January to March in the south.

Taxonomy and naming
Eucalyptus tindaliae was first formally described in 1929 by Joseph Maiden in his book A Critical Revision of the Genus Eucalyptus. The specific epithet (tindaliae) honours Anne Grant Tindal (1859–1928), a member of a farming family from northern New South Wales.

Distribution and habitat
Tindal's stringybark grows on heavy soils in closed forest in near-coastal areas between the Atherton Tableland and Coffs Harbour.

References 

tindaliae
Myrtales of Australia
Flora of New South Wales
Flora of Queensland
Plants described in 1929